The list of ship launches in 1977 includes a chronological list of all ships launched in 1977.


References

1977
1977 in transport